
Gmina Kondratowice is a rural gmina (administrative district) in Strzelin County, Lower Silesian Voivodeship, in south-western Poland.

Neighbouring gminas
Gmina Kondratowice is bordered by the gminas of Borów, Ciepłowody, Jordanów Śląski, Łagiewniki, Niemcza and Strzelin.

Villages
The gmina contains the villages of Białobrzezie, Błotnica, Brochocinek, Czerwieniec, Edwardów, Gołostowice, Górka Sobocka, Grzegorzów, Janowiczki, Jezierzyce Małe, Karczyn, Komorowice, Kondratowice, Kowalskie, Księginice Wielkie, Lipowa, Maleszów, Podgaj, Prusy, Rakowice, Sadowice, Skała, Stachów, Strachów, Wójcin, Zarzyca and Żelowice.

Twin towns – sister cities

Gmina Kondratowice is twinned with:
 Častolovice, Czech Republic
 Jablonné nad Orlicí, Czech Republic

References

Kondratowice
Strzelin County